The following is a list of Sites of Special Scientific Interest in the Cumnock and Kyle  Area of Search. For other areas, see List of SSSIs by Area of Search.

 Afton Lodge
 Ailsa Craig
 Aldons Hill
 Auchalton
 Ballantrae Shingle Beach
 Barlosh Moss
 Benbeoch
 Bennane Head Grasslands
 Blair Farm
 Blood Moss and Slot Burn
 Bogton Loch
 Byne Hill
 Craig Wood
 Craighead Quarry
 Dalmellington Moss
 Dunaskin Glen
 Dundonald Wood
 Feoch Meadows
 Fountainhead
 Garpel Water
 Girvan to Ballantrae Coast Section
 Glen App and Galloway Moors
 Greenock Mains
 Howford Bridge
 Knockdaw Hill
 Knockdolian Hill
 Knockgardner
 Knockormal
 Laggan Burn
 Littleton and Balhamie Hills
 Loch Doon
 Lugar Sill
 Maidens - Doonfoot
 Martnaham Loch and Wood
 Merrick Kells
 Millenderdale
 Muirkirk Uplands
 Ness Glen
 Nith Bridge
 North Lowther Uplands
 Penwhapple Burn
 Pinbain Burn to Cairn Hill
 River Ayr Gorge
 Roughneuk Quarry
 Sgavoch
 South Threave
 Stairhill
 Troon Golf Links and Foreshore
 Turnberry Dunes
 Turnberry Lighthouse to Port Murray

 
Cumnock and Kyle